Bangladesh National Film Award for Best Actress is the highest award for film actresses in Bangladesh.

List of winners
Key

Records and statistics

Multiple wins
The following individuals received two or more Best Actress awards:

See also
 Bangladesh National Film Award for Best Actor
 Bangladesh National Film Award for Best Supporting Actor
 Bangladesh National Film Award for Best Supporting Actress

Notes

References

Actress
National Film Awards (Bangladesh)